Venganza is the debut full-length album by the Mexican death metal band Hacavitz. This is the only album to feature Eduardo Guevara on guitar.

Track listing

Credits
Antimo Buonnano - guitar, bass, vocals
Eduardo Guevara - guitar
Oscar Garcia - drums

2005 debut albums
Hacavitz (band) albums